Denis Olegovich Shebanov (born 27 November 1989) is a Russian professional association football player. He plays for FC Kaluga.

Club career
He made his Russian Football National League debut for FC Mordovia Saransk on 17 October 2010 in a game against FC Luch-Energiya Vladivostok.

Personal life
His younger brother Alexey Shebanov is also a professional footballer.

References

External links
 
 

1989 births
People from Saransk
Living people
Russian footballers
Association football goalkeepers
FC Mordovia Saransk players
FC KAMAZ Naberezhnye Chelny players
FC Armavir players
FC Urozhay Krasnodar players
Sportspeople from Mordovia